State Route 160 (SR 160) is a north–south state highway in the southeastern portion of the U.S. state of Ohio.  Its southern terminus is at SR 7 in Gallipolis, and the route heads north.  It meets U.S. Route 35 at an interchange with various collector and distributor ramps. SR 160 southbound bypasses the interchange on a  road officially designated SR 160-A.  From there, the route passes through Vinton in northern Gallia County.  Following an intersection with SR 32, the route heads in a more westerly direction until it meets and its northern terminus is at State Route 93 in Hamden.

History

1926 

1970
Extended south to Gallipolis along the previous alignment of U.S. Route 35 (which was the former State Route 11 before 1926).

Major intersections

References

External links

160
Transportation in Gallia County, Ohio
Transportation in Vinton County, Ohio